VP3 is a video compression format owned by Google and created by On2 Technologies.

VP3 may also refer to:

 Apollo VP3, a computer chipset
 Virtual Pool 3, a video game
 VP3, a viral protein; for example in Rotavirus
 VP-3, a patrol squadron of the U.S. Navy